Alejandro Tomas Campos (born 21 April 1983) is an Argentine rugby union player who plays at flanker or number eight in the Top 14, for Agen.  He has also represented Argentina.

References

External links
Profile at uar.com.ar (in Spanish)

1983 births
Living people
Rugby union players from Buenos Aires
Argentine rugby union players
Argentina international rugby union players
ASM Clermont Auvergne players
Rugby union flankers
Rugby union number eights